Kreis Wongrowitz (until 1875 Kreis Wongrowiec) was one of several districts in the northern administrative region of Bromberg, in the Prussian province of Posen.

History
The district of Wongrowiec was initially a district in the Prussian province of South Prussia, which became part of Prussia after the Second Partition of Poland in 1793. With the Treaty of Tilsit in 1807, it passed to the Duchy of Warsaw. After the Congress of Vienna in 1815, the district was returned to Prussia and became part of Bromberg Region in the Grand Duchy of Posen and from 1848, the Province of Posen. The district capital was the town of Wongrowiec.

As part of the Province of Posen, the Wongrowiec district became part of the German Empire in 1871. In 1875 the town and the district of Wongrowiec were renamed Wongrowitz. In 1887, a large part of the district, including the town of Janowiec Wielkopolski was ceded to the newly formed Znin district.

On December 27, 1918, the Greater Poland uprising began in the province of Posen, and by December 30, 1918, the district town of Wongrowitz was under Polish control. On February 16, 1919, an armistice ended the Polish-German fighting, and on June 28, 1919, the German government officially ceded the Wongrowitz district to the Second Polish Republic with the signing of the Treaty of Versailles.

Demographics 
According to the census of 1858, Kreis Wongrowitz had a population of 51,127, of which 13,230 (25.9%) were Germans and 37,897 (74.1%) were Poles.

Geographical features

Communities 
These records come from the 1905 Prussian gazetteer Gemeindelexikon für das Königreich Preußen.

Military command 
Kreis Wongrowitz was part of the military command

Court system 
The main court (German: Landgericht) was in Gnesen, also Bromberg and Schneidemühl, with smaller courts (German: Amtsgericht) in Wongrowitz (LG=Genesen), Exin (LG=Bromberg) and Margonin (LG=Schneidemühl).

Standesämter 
"Standesamt" is the German name of the local civil registration offices which were established in October 1874 soon after the German Empire was formed. Births, marriages and deaths were recorded. Previously, only the church records were used for Christians. In 1905, these Standesämter served towns in Kreis Wongrowitz:

Police districts 
In 1905, these police districts (German: Polizeidistrikt) served towns in Kreis Wongrowitz:

Catholic churches 
In 1905, these Catholic parish churches served towns in Kreis Wongrowitz:

Protestant churches 
In 1905, these Protestant parish churches served towns in Kreis Wongrowitz:

Officials

References

External links 

 List of genealogical records

Districts of the Province of Posen